Rohwer may refer to:
 Rohwer, Arkansas, United States

People with the surname 
 Detlev Rohwer (1917–1944), German Luftwaffe ace
 Forest Rohwer (born 1969), American microbial ecologist
 Jürgen Rohwer (1924–2015), German historian
Lauren Rohwer, American scientist
 Ray Rohwer (1895–1988), American baseball player
 Sievert Allen Rohwer (1887–1951), American entomologist
 William Rohwer (1937–2016), American psychologist